The 2nd Golden Rooster Award honoring the best in mainland film of 1982. Award Ceremony held in Xian, Shaanxi Province.

Winners and nominees

Special Award 
Special Jury Award
Honorary Award: 
Documentary: Steel Great Wall
Director: Zhang Nuanxin（The Drive to Win）

References

External links 
 The 2nd Golden Rooster Award

1982
Golden Rooster Awards
Golden Rooster Awards
Golden Rooster Awards, 2nd